Dmitriyevka is a rural locality (a village) in Beloozersky Selsoviet, Gafuriysky District, Bashkortostan, Russia. The population was 127 as of 2010.

Geography 
It is located 21 km from Krasnousolsky and 5 km from Beloye Ozero.

References 

Rural localities in Gafuriysky District